The raspberry ellagitannin is an ellagitannin found in raspberries. It is a polyphenol per se, containing 6 ellagic acid-type components and two additional monomeric phenolics, for a total of 14 gallic acid units (and all of their substituent phenolic hydroxyl groups).

See also 
 Sanguiin H-6
 Lambertianin C
 Raspberry ketone

References 

Ellagitannins
Natural phenol trimers
ellagitannin